A chicken wing tackle is a move in Australian rules football and rugby league, in which a player locks an opponent's arm so that he or she cannot legally move the ball. It is a controversial move that has injured players and resulted in fines and suspensions for players performing the tackle. The phrase was coined by Fox Sports NRL Producer Geoff Bullock (a.k.a. Bluey) in 2008.

Rugby league
Melbourne Storm forward Adam Blair was found guilty of committing a chicken wing tackle in an Australian Rugby League match against Brisbane Broncos in April 2008. A former Melbourne Storm player, of Hull Kingston Rovers in the Super League was fined £300 after performing the tackle, with a disciplinary panel finding him guilty of "behaviour contrary to the true spirit of the game by making a dangerous tackle".

Australian rules football
The use of the chicken wing tackle in the Australian Football League is generally considered to have been picked up from National Rugby League.
It became a controversy after Kangaroos' skipper Brent Harvey was chicken winged in 2009 during an Australian football match and suffered a dislocated elbow that caused him to miss months of play. The tackle has been furiously slammed by some saying it must be banned. AFL umpires manager Jeff Gieschen is confident the practice is not about to become commonplace.

In July 2012, Carlton captain Chris Judd was involved in another "chicken wing tackle" controversy, in a game against North Melbourne. North player Leigh Adams had been tackled by another player, and was lying on the ground, as Judd grabbed his arm and pulled it backwards in the 'chicken wing' style. Judd was widely criticised in the media for this action and was cited for misconduct by the Match Review Panel. He was subsequently suspended for 4 games by the tribunal.

References

Rugby league terminology
Rugby league in Australia
Australian rules football terminology
Laws of Australian rules football
National Rugby League
Rugby league controversies
Banned sports tactics